Noah Becker (born 1970) is an American and Canadian artist, writer, publisher of Whitehot Magazine of Contemporary Art, and jazz saxophonist who lives and works in New York City. He is a contributing writer for Art in America Magazine, Canadian Art Magazine and the Huffington Post.

Early life and education
Becker was born in Cleveland, Ohio and grew up on a 40-acre farm on Thetis Island, off the coast of British Columbia, Canada. He moved with his family to Victoria, British Columbia, at age 15, after their house burned down. He had little early formal education and did not attend high school. He was a student at Victoria College of Art, and completed a year studying saxophone at Humber College, before moving to New York in 2004.

Whitehot Magazine of Contemporary Art
Becker is the founder and editor-in-chief of Whitehot Magazine of Contemporary Art, an online contemporary art magazine that was established in 2005.

Art
Becker lives and works in Brooklyn. His oil paintings have been exhibited in numerous museums, galleries, and major art fairs in Canada, the United States and Europe, including in New York City, Los Angeles, Detroit,  London, Vancouver, Toronto, Montreal, Miami and Switzerland. He had a New York solo exhibition in November, 2013.

Music
Becker's first album, Where We Are, features guitarist Kurt Rosenwinkel. Becker's recent recordings as a sideman have been with Canadian hip hop artist Moka Only. Rosenwinkel and Only also contributed music to the soundtrack of New York Is Now, Becker's 2010 documentary on the New York art scene. Becker performed with saxophonist David Murray at New York City's jazz club The Village Vanguard in 2018.

Awards
In 2009, Becker was one of 15 artists nominated for the RBC (Royal Bank of Canada) Painting Prize. This exhibition toured Becker's painting to Musée D'Art Contemporain De Montréal and the Power Plant in Toronto.

NYArts magazine named him as one of their 30 Artists To Watch in 2012.

Becker was awarded second prize in the College Arts 86’ competition judged by Canadian artist Alex Colville

Becker's work is in The Michael C. Williams Collection of the Maltwood Art Museum and Gallery at the University of Victoria in Saanich, British Columbia, and was added to the permanent collection of the Art Gallery of Greater Victoria, in May, 2014.

References

External links
 Whitehot Magazine of Contemporary Art Homepage
 Noah Becker Paintings

1970 births
Living people
American emigrants to Canada
Art writers
Artists from Victoria, British Columbia
Musicians from Victoria, British Columbia
Canadian jazz saxophonists
Male saxophonists
20th-century Canadian painters
Canadian male painters
21st-century Canadian painters
Writers from Victoria, British Columbia
21st-century saxophonists
21st-century Canadian male musicians
Canadian male jazz musicians
20th-century Canadian male artists
21st-century Canadian male artists